The Gambia competed at the 2018 Summer Youth Olympics in Buenos Aires, Argentina from 6 to 18 October 2018.

Competitors

Athletics

Beach volleyball

Swimming

References

2018 in Gambian sport
Nations at the 2018 Summer Youth Olympics
The Gambia at the Youth Olympics